Eslamabad (also Romanized as Eslāmābād; also known as Eslāmābād-e Chaman) is a village in Donbaleh Rud-e Jonubi Rural District, Dehdez District, Izeh County, Khuzestan Province, Iran. At the 2006 census, its population was 147, in 28 families.

References 

Populated places in Izeh County